The Way I Am is the third studio album from folk rock musician Jennifer Knapp, her fifth album overall and her final Christian rock album to date. It was released on November 20, 2001 through Gotee Records.

Critical reception

Ashleigh Kittle of AllMusic concludes her review by writing, "In the end, with this release Knapp has yet to disappoint. She only serves to build and further shape the gift and talent demonstrated on her debut release, Kansas."

Mike Rimmer of Cross Rhythms gives this album 10 out of a possible 10 and remarks, "this is definitely a grower not a grabber and it took a number of listens before its intricate wonders revealed themselves to me!" He finishes the review by saying, "Just check out the 3am sound of "Around Me" which features understated jazzy guitar and Jennifer's vocals and plenty of vibe. Just fabulous! But then so is the whole album."

John DiBiase of Jesus Freak Hideout gives the album 4½ out of a possible 5 stars and concludes his review with, "The Way I Am is a solid album with more than you'd expect from even someone as talented as Jennifer Knapp. It tugs at your emotions and may surprise you how often it seems like Jennifer shares your same thoughts and feelings."

Track listing

Musicians 
 Jennifer Knapp – vocals, guitar, arrangements (2, 5, 8, 9, 10)
 David Hentschel – keyboards (1-4, 6-9, 11), programming (1-4, 6-9, 11), drum programming (1-4, 6-9, 11), arrangements (1, 3, 4, 6, 7, 11), string arrangements (2, 6, 10)
 Tony McAnany – additional arrangements (1), keyboards (2, 3, 6, 11), drum programming (2, 3, 4, 6, 11), arrangements (3, 6, 7, 11), spoken word (11)
 Nick Moroch – acoustic guitars (1-4, 6-9, 11), electric guitars (1-4, 6-9, 11), electric bass (2, 3, 11), guitar solo (6), Fender Telecaster solo (9)
 Tony Levin – bass (1, 6-9, 11), basses (2)
 Vinnie Colaiuta – drums (1-9, 11)
 Bashiri Johnson – percussion (3)
 Gavyn Wright – concertmaster (1, 2, 3, 6-9, 11, 12)
 The London Studio Orchestra – strings (1, 2, 3, 6-9, 11, 12)
 Nigel Black – French horn (10)
 Philip Eastop – French horn (10)
 David Daniels – cello (10)
 Tony Pleeth – cello (10), cello solo (12)
 David Theodore – oboe (12)
 Jeremy Lubbock – arrangements (12)
 Morgan Ames – music copyist (12)
 Emmett Estren – music copyist (12)
 Steven Juliani – music copyist (12)
 Jim Boggia – backing vocals (4, 7, 11)
 TobyMac – spoken word (11)

The Symphony of Voices on "Light of The World"
 Jim Boggia, Knowdaverbs (Michael Boyer II), Coffee (Stacy Jones), Kia Jones, TobyMac and Steve Thomas
 Tony McAnany – vocal arrangements

Production 
 Toby McKeehan – executive producer
 Joey Elwood – executive producer
 Tony McAnany – producer
 Roy Hendrickson – recording, mixing
 Steve Price – string recording (1, 2, 3, 6-12)
 Scott Hull – mastering at Classic Sound (New York City, New York)
 Mike McGlaflin – A&R direction 
 Ben Pearson – photography
 Jen Reardon – sunset photography
 Aaron Marrs – creative design, layout design
 Eddy Boer – creative director

Track information and credits adapted from the album's liner notes.

Charts

References

2001 albums
Jennifer Knapp albums
Gotee Records albums